1888 is a 2022 Indian thriller film shot using Guerrilla filmmaking technique. It is a micro-budget, independent Kannada film with demonetization as the backdrop. More than 60% of the film is shot at night. Neethu Shetty plays an important character along with Prathap Kumar, Adhvithi Shetty, Manju Raj, Pradeep Doddaiah and Vikram Kumar. Former Mr. India - Raghu Ramappa appears in a guest role in the movie. The movie is directed by debutante Sourabh Shukla who has also written the story and screenplay. Pradeep is the Director of Photography and Girish Hothur is the Music Composer.

Cast 

 Neethu Shetty as Sandhya Shetty
 Prathap Kumar as Vikas
 Adhvithy Shetty as Ankita
 Manju Raj as ?
 Vikram Kumar as Aruna
 Pradeep Doddaiah as Pradeep Shetty
 Sourabh Shukla as PK
 Valerian Menezes as Detective

Awards and nominations

References

External links

2020s Kannada-language films